Ivana Bulatović (born October 12, 1994 in Berane, Montenegro) is an alpine skier from Montenegro. She competed for Montenegro at the 2014 Winter Olympics in the slalom competition, and finished 44th overall. She was the first female athlete to represent the country at the Winter Olympics as well.

See also
Montenegro at the 2014 Winter Olympics

References 

1994 births
Living people
Olympic alpine skiers of Montenegro
Alpine skiers at the 2014 Winter Olympics
Montenegrin female alpine skiers
People from Berane